Brownlow Cecil, 9th Earl of Exeter (21 September 1725 – 26 December 1793), known as Lord Burghley from 1725 to 1754, was a British peer and Member of Parliament.

Life
Exeter was the eldest son of Brownlow Cecil, 8th Earl of Exeter, and Hannah Sophia Chambers. He was educated at Winchester and St John's College, Cambridge. He was elected to the House of Commons for Rutland in 1747, a seat he held until 1754, when he succeeded his father in the earldom and entered the House of Lords. He also served as Lord Lieutenant of Rutland.

Between 1755 and 1779, the 9th Earl employed Lancelot 'Capability' Brown to landscape the Burghley House Deer Park.

Lord Exeter died in December 1793, aged 68. He was childless and was succeeded in his titles by his nephew Henry, who was created Marquess of Exeter in 1801.

References 

 Kidd, Charles, Williamson, David (editors). Debrett's Peerage and Baronetage (1990 edition). New York: St Martin's Press, 1990.
 
 www.thepeerage.com

1725 births
1793 deaths
18th-century English nobility
Barons Burghley
Alumni of St John's College, Cambridge
Brownlow Cecil, 9th Earl of Exeter
Earls of Exeter
Lord-Lieutenants of Rutland
Burghley, Brownlow Cecil, Lord
British MPs 1747–1754
British MPs 1754–1761
Fellows of the Royal Society